Bonita Sue "Bonnie" Dunbar (born February 14, 1948) is a former professor in the department of molecular and cell biology at Baylor College of Medicine, a position she held from 1994 to 2004. Prior thereto she was an assistant professor in the same department at the same university from 1981 to 1983. From 1984 to 1994, also at Baylor College of Medicine, she also held a position as associate professor in the department of obstetrics and gynecology. She is currently an honorary lecturer at the University of Nairobi. She is a member of the American Association for the Advancement of Science, the Endocrine Society, the American Society for Cell Biology, and the New York Academy of Sciences. She is currently the owner of the Karen Blixen Coffee Garden Restaurant and Cottages, as well as the treasurer of the African Biomedical Center. She also served on the editorial board of the journal Medical Veritas, which was published from 2004 to 2008 and endorsed anti-vaccine views.

Education
Dunbar was born in Sterling, Colorado. She received her bachelors' (1970) and masters' (1971) degrees from the University of Colorado Boulder, followed by a PhD in zoology from the University of Tennessee in 1977. She did postdoctoral research from 1975 to 1978 at the University of California Davis.

Scientific career
After completing her postdoc, Dunbar worked at the Population Council of Rockefeller University until 1981, when she became an assistant professor at Baylor College of Medicine's department of cell biology. Her research into the zona pellucida as a graduate student led her to the search for a contraceptive when she noticed that some infertile women had antibodies to their own zona pellucida, preventing the sperm from entering the egg when sex took place. To this end, she proposed the injection of pig proteins into rabbits to induce autoimmunity, a proposal which proved successful; however, it was not without serious side effects: the rabbits thus immunized developed an autoimmune disease which resulted in their immune system attacking their ovaries, causing permanent ovarian failure. She has also said that her interest in this arose because "...in my young years I had a vision that maybe we could help the world population problem and provide women with an option for birth control that was not invasive in our hormones or our systems or otherwise have the side effects we now see with a lot of contraceptive methods." In February 1991, Dr. Dunbar received a patent on such a vaccine while affiliated with Zonagen. In 1994, Dunbar filed a lawsuit accusing Baylor College of Medicine, the Houston-based law firm Fulbright & Jaworski, Zonagen, and a group of investors of forcing her to relinquish patent rights to this vaccine. In 1999, the parties reached a settlement; the terms were not disclosed, but Dunbar said she was "very happy" with it. In June 2001, Dunbar lost everything she had been storing in her lab—"20 years of research" according to the Houston Chronicle—after Tropical Storm Allison devastated Baylor College of Medicine.

Views on the Hepatitis B vaccine
Dunbar has vocally criticized the hepatitis B vaccine, which, she claims, may be more dangerous than Hepatitis B itself for a small portion of the Caucasian population. She began suspecting the vaccine was dangerous after her brother, Bohn, developed rashes on his face, fatigue, and a number of other symptoms after being vaccinated with it. In 2000, Dunbar said that her brother "hasn't been out of bed since" he received the Hepatitis B vaccine. Her beliefs surrounding the potential dangers of these vaccines are well-summed up in this quote: "The only thing that happened [to medical workers who developed multiple sclerosis] is they took this vaccine, and within a month most of these people have had completely debilitating lifestyle changes."

References

American molecular biologists
Baylor College of Medicine faculty
1948 births
Living people
Vaccinologists
University of Colorado Boulder alumni
University of Tennessee alumni
People from Sterling, Colorado
21st-century American zoologists
Women medical researchers
American women biologists
University of California, Davis alumni
American women academics
21st-century American women scientists